Journal de Bruxelles was a Belgian newspaper, printed 1841-1926 (with publication suspended under the German occupation of Belgium during World War I). It was one of the leading dailies in late 19th and early 20th-century Brussels, and was aligned with the Catholic interest in public affairs.

Proprietors
Dieudonné Stas founded a newspaper in Liège in 1820 under the title Courrier de la Meuse, but moved it to Brussels under the new title in 1841. Stas retired in 1856, when management was taken over by Paul Nève, who ran the newspaper until 1862.

Editors
Alexandre Delmer did the bulk of the editorial work 1863-1871. He left to become editor in chief of the Courrier de Bruxelles in July 1871. The editor in chief of the Journal de Bruxelles from 1878 to 1890 was Prosper de Haulleville.

Further reading
 Marthe Blanpain, Le "Journal de Bruxelles", histoire interne de 1863 à 1871 (Leuven and Paris, 1965)

References

French-language newspapers published in Belgium
Publications established in 1841
1841 establishments in Belgium
Publications disestablished in 1926
1926 disestablishments in Belgium
Defunct daily newspapers